Javier Viñolas (born 11 March 1971) is a Spanish rowing coxswain. He competed in the men's coxed four event at the 1988 Summer Olympics.

References

1971 births
Living people
Spanish male rowers
Olympic rowers of Spain
Rowers at the 1988 Summer Olympics
Place of birth missing (living people)